Yasser Hareb is a writer and TV presenter from the Emirate of Dubai, United Arab Emirates. Shaikh Mohammed bin Rashid Al Maktoum, vice president and prime minister of the UAE and ruler of Dubai awarded Yasser Hareb, the Arab Social Media Influencers Award in the Positivity and Tolerance category in 2016. He was acting CEO and as vice president of culture and education at Mohammed bin Rashid Al Maktoum Foundation. Prior to that he was director of special projects at The Executive Office of HH Sheikh Mohammed bin Rashid Al Maktoum. He was also secretary general of the Arab Strategic Forum and director of operations at the Dubai Institute for Human Development. Currently he is a member of Supreme National Committee for Tolerance established in the UAE, by the president, His Highness Sheikh Khalifa bin Zayed Al Nahyan, to celebrate 2019 as the Year of Tolerance. He is known for his novel “Take Off Your Shoes” whose foreword is by Paulo Coelho. He is also a co-founder of Promoting Peace in Muslim Societies global forum, which is hosted annually by Abu Dhabi City.

 Education 

Yasser has a Bachelors in Information Systems, and is a graduate of leadership programs.

 Bachelor of Management Information Systems, UAE University.
 Mohammed bin Rashid Al Maktoum Leadership Program.
 INSEAD Young Leadership Program.
 INSEAD Blue Ocean Strategy Program.

 Career 
Yasser has held positions at Mohammed bin Rashid Al Maktoum Foundation as acting CEO and as Vice President of Culture and Education.Prior to that he was Director of Special Projects at The Executive Office of HH Sheikh Mohammed bin Rashid Al Maktoum. He was also Secretary General of the Arab Strategic Forum and Director of Operations at the Dubai Institute for Human Development. Currently he is a member of Supreme National Committee for Tolerance established in the UAE, by the President, His Highness Sheikh Khalifa bin Zayed Al Nahyan, to celebrate 2019 as the Year of Tolerance.

 Social contributions 
Yasser is the co-founder of the Muslim Council of Elders. In 2019, Yasser was chosen as a member of Supreme National Committee for Tolerance established in the UAE, by the President, His Highness Sheikh Khalifa bin Zayed Al Nahyan, to celebrate 2019 as the Year of Tolerance. Yasser co-founded the Muslim Council of Elders, an international body of Muslim Scholars formed to find solutions to disputes and divisions in Muslim communities. The Forum for Promoting Peace in Muslim Societies was also co-established by him which is an yearly event that assembles intellectuals from around the world in an attempt to resolve conflicts within Muslim Nations. President Obama and the United Nations Secretary General Ban Ki-moon acknowledged the event for its intentions. Yasser also initiated and founded social impact programs such as TARJEM (translate) and OKTUB (write). TARJEM was a translation program in the Arab world in 2007, it impacted translations and resulted in over 1000 books being translated into Arabic. The program also trained Arab translators and help found publishing houses exclusively translating books into Arabic. OKTUB is an Arab Youth Development Program with the purpose of finding young Arab talents possessing talent to become authors.

Writings

Yasser is the author of Towards a New Thought in 2006,Picasso and Starbucks in 2011, The New Slaves in 2013 and Take Off Your Shoes in 2015 forwarded by Paulo Coelho.

 Press articles 
Yasser writes for the newspapers Al Bayan (UAE), Gulf News  (UAE), Al Wasat (Bahrain), Al Sharq  (Saudi Arabia) and El-Watan (Egypt).

Honors and awards
Arab Social Media Influencers Award - Winners in Individuals Category (Positivity and Tolerance category)

TV programs
Yasser Hareb is the presenter of Ma Kal wa Dal, a program that specializes in self, personal and social development, and is broadcast every Ramadan. The program provides viewers with practical methods and tools to develop their skills and aims to promote positive change in society. The program has been broadcast for five consecutive seasons in the Middle East and is being shown on several television channels and on the Internet.

Hareb also presented the program Lahza'', which was broadcast in the month of Ramadan 2016 on the screen of MBC satellite channel.

Yasser Hareb also presented the show Aswat, that debuted in 2018 on MBC 1.

Kingdoms of Fire
Kingdoms of Fire (Arabic: ممالك النار‎, romanized: Mamalik Al-Nar) is an Arab historical drama television series about the reign of Ottoman Empire's Selim I and Mamluk Sultanate's Tuman bay II, created by Muhammed Abdulmalik, directed by British director Peter Webber and produced by Genomedia, a production company founded in 2016 by Yasser Hareb.

The 14-episode series which is produced by Genomedia Studios with a budget of $40 million and filmed in Tunisia, debuted on MBC channels on 17 November 2019. The series depicts events that took place between Egypt, Syria and the Ottoman Empire between the 15th and the 16th century. It demonstrates the competition between the Mamluks and the Ottomans over the control of the Middle East, through the rise of two main characters, Tuman bay II, the last Sultan of the Mamluks in Cairo, and Sultan Selim I of Istanbul.

References

21st-century Emirati writers
Emirati journalists
Arab television personalities
1978 births
Living people